Natica fulminea, common name the lightning moon snail, is a species of predatory sea snail, a marine gastropod mollusk in the family Naticidae, the moon snails.

Description
The size of the shell varies between 18 mm and 35 mm.

Distribution
This species occurs in the Atlantic Ocean off Gabon, the Western Sahara and Angola.

References

 Bernard, P.A. (Ed.) (1984). Coquillages du Gabon [Shells of Gabon]. Pierre A. Bernard: Libreville, Gabon. 140, 75 plates pp.

External links
 

Naticidae
Gastropods described in 1791